Kategoria e Parë is the second level of professional football in Albania, behind the Kategoria Superiore and above the Kategoria e Dytë.

Format
Kategoria e Parë was founded in 1930. It is made up of 14 teams. The 2 best ranked teams gain promotion to the Kategoria Superiore, while the teams ranked from the 3rd to the 6th position qualify to a play-off tournament where the winner then plays a promotion play-off match against the 8th ranked team of Kategoria Superiore. The teams that finish in the 4 last positions get relegated to the Kategoria e Dytë. The 9th and 10th ranked teams, qualify to the relegation play-off round.

Clubs (2022–23)

Champions

See also
 List of football clubs in Albania

References

2
 
Second level football leagues in Europe